Knut Hauge may refer to:

 Knut Hauge (writer) (1911–1999), Norwegian writer
 Knut Hauge (diplomat) (born 1953), Norwegian diplomat

See also
 Knut Haug (born 1934), Norwegian politician for the Conservative Party